is a Japanese football player. He plays for YSCC Yokohama.

Career
Yusuke Nishiyama joined J3 League club YSCC Yokohama in 2017.

Club statistics
Updated to 13 August 2018.

References

External links

1994 births
Living people
Yamanashi Gakuin University alumni
Association football people from Tokyo
Japanese footballers
J3 League players
YSCC Yokohama players
Gainare Tottori players
Association football defenders